Teliucu Inferior is a commune in Hunedoara County, Transylvania, Romania. It is composed of four villages: Cinciș-Cerna (Csolnakoscserna), Izvoarele (Lindzsina), Teliucu Inferior and Teliucu Superior (Felsőtelek).

Iron mining began there in Roman times.

Natives
 Aurel Țicleanu

References

Communes in Hunedoara County
Localities in Transylvania